Still Hard Times is an album by saxophonist David "Fathead" Newman recorded in 1982 and released on the Muse label.

Reception

In his review for AllMusic, Scott Yanow stated: "Newman has a particularly strong supporting cast. ... The music is soulful, swinging, and full of honest feeling, with Newman and Crawford heard in prime form".

Track listing 
All compositions by David "Fathead" Newman except where noted
 "Shana" – 4:55
 "Blisters" (Hank Crawford) – 5:08
 "One for My Baby (and One More for the Road)" (Harold Arlen, Johnny Mercer) – 5:55
 "To Love Again" (Crawford) – 4:55
 "Still Hard Times" – 6:00
 "Please Send Me Someone to Love" (Percy Mayfield) – 5:47
 "Shana" [alternative take] – 5:18 Additional track on CD release
 "To Love Again" [alternative take] (Crawford) – 5:03 Additional track on CD release
 "Still Hard Times" [alternative take] – 6:20 Additional track on CD release

Personnel 
David Newman – tenor saxophone, alto saxophone, soprano saxophone, flute
Hank Crawford – alto saxophone (tracks 1, 2, & 4-9)
Charlie Miller – trumpet (tracks 1, 2, 4, 5 & 7-9)
Howard Johnson – baritone saxophone (tracks 1, 2, 4, 5 & 7-9)
Steve Nelson – vibraphone (tracks 3 & 6)
Larry Willis – piano
Walter Booker - bass
Jimmy Cobb – drums

References 

David "Fathead" Newman albums
1982 albums
Muse Records albums
Albums produced by Michael Cuscuna